The Women's +78 kg competition at the 2018 World Judo Championships was held on 26 September 2018.

Results

Finals

Repechage

Pool A

Pool B

Pool C

Pool D

Prize money
The sums listed bring the total prizes awarded to €57,000 for the individual event.

References

External links
 
 Draw

W79
World Judo Championships Women's Heavyweight
World W79